Rick Coles (born January 9, 1957) is an American football coach and former player. He is as the offensive coordinator at Ripon College in Ripon, Wisconsin, a position he has held since 2004. Coles served as the head football coach at Lawrence University from 1993 to 1998, compiling a record of 16–39.

References

1957 births
Living people
American football centers
Coe Kohawks football players
Coe Kohawks football coaches
Cornell Rams football coaches
Lawrence Vikings football coaches
Ripon Red Hawks football coaches
High school football coaches in Iowa
People from Ottawa County, Michigan
Players of American football from Michigan